is a former Japanese football player.

Playing career
Okanaka was born in Hyogo Prefecture on September 26, 1968. After graduating from Tokai University, he joined Matsushita Electric (later Gamba Osaka) in 1991. He battles with Kenji Honnami for regular goalkeeper for a long time. Although he could not play many matches in early 1990, he became a regular goalkeeper in late 1996. However he lost his position behind Ryota Tsuzuki in 2000. In 2002, he moved to J2 League club Oita Trinita. He played as regular goalkeeper and the club won the champions in 2000 and was promoted to J1 League. Although he played as regular goalkeeper in 2003, his opportunity to play decreased behind Riki Takasaki and Shusaku Nishikawa from 2004. He retired end of 2005 season.

Club statistics

References

External links

1968 births
Living people
Tokai University alumni
Association football people from Hyōgo Prefecture
Japanese footballers
Japan Soccer League players
J1 League players
J2 League players
Gamba Osaka players
Oita Trinita players
Association football goalkeepers